Dolphin is a fictional character, a superheroine in the DC Comics universe. Created by writer-artist Jay Scott Pike, she debuted in Showcase #79 (December 1968).

Fictional character biography
Dolphin was a very young girl when she fell overboard from a cruise ship (Secret Origins #50) only to be saved from drowning when a mysterious alien race abducted her to use as an experimental prototype for a subaquatic humanoid race. In the course of these experiments she acquired various biophysical adaptations similar to ocean themed fauna forms or mariner races.
 
When the alien scientists abandoned the experiment, Dolphin escaped their underwater lab. Oblivious to her former humanity, the feral young Dolphin scavenged underwater for her livelihood, eventually finding her trademark short blue-jeans and white shirt inside a sunken ship. She has been alone her entire life, constantly swimming and enjoying her personal freedom. As she grew into young womanhood, she became tired of living an isolated, lonely life. One day, the crew of an oceanology vessel saved her from a near lethal encounter with a dolphin-killing shark and took her aboard their ship to help her.

Over time, the crew of the ship tried to educate and care for the girl they'd dubbed "Dolphin", but her utter lack of contact with either humans or Atlanteans had left her mute. Though she grew to understand spoken language fairly quickly, the act of speech itself remained beyond her. Then, a young female doctor on the crew had the bright idea to instruct her in sign language. Finally able to communicate, Dolphin explained what she could of herself and her story, and expressed her desire to resume her undersea life. At some point, Dolphin finally mastered spoken language, (especially when she started having contact with the superheroic community), but never lost her shyness and reluctance to speak. She has since been a woman of few words.

Crisis years
Dolphin has stayed mostly on the fringes of the superheroic community, although she was a member of the Forgotten Heroes until their dissolution, and fought alongside them during the Crisis on Infinite Earths.

Meeting Aquaman and Marrying Tempest
During the Zero Hour events, she met Aquaman, and took part in the battle against Charybdis, a villain interested in the aquatic powers of the two heroes. When Charybdis, after robbing Aquaman of his telepathic powers, stuck Aquaman's hand in a pool of water teeming with piranhas, the normally pacifist Dolphin was forced to shoot the madman. She carried both the wounded Aquaman and Aqualad back to Atlantis for medical attention, saving their lives and earning their trust and love.

Afterwards, she became a supporting character in the Aquaman comic book, and soon won the affections of an Aquaman embittered by the loss of his hand. Over time, she came out of her shell, and displayed a more energetic and bubbly, though naive, personality.
 
In issue #25 of Aquaman volume 5 it was revealed that Kordax, an evil merman ancestor of Aquaman's, had secretly set Dolphin free from the lab, and used mind control to prompt her to infiltrate the royal court and kill Aquaman as the agent of his revenge on the royal house of Atlantis. The strong-willed Dolphin broke free of his control, and her romantic involvement with the king of Atlantis grew into love.

Dolphin remained Aquaman's lover until Mera, Aquaman's wife, returned from her exile in another dimension called the Netherworld. In the same period, Aqualad, now calling himself Tempest, returned from several years of extradimensional magic studies with increased powers and confidence, winning Dolphin's heart with a kiss. Though initially taken aback, Aquaman blessed the relationship. Eventually, Dolphin became pregnant by Tempest, and the two were married in an Atlantean ceremony attended by Tempest's second family, the Titans.

Dolphin gave birth to a son, whom Aquaman named Cerdian (after Cerdia, a surface nation annexed by Atlantis). The weight of new familial responsibilities initially strained the relationship between Dolphin and Tempest. These tensions came to a head when Dolphin demanded Tempest choose between his duties as a hero and his duties as a father and husband. Tempest complied, and quit the Titans. When Aquaman was exiled for his role in the sinking of Atlantis, the family fell under suspicion as friends of the deposed king. The new sorcerous rulers deemed Dolphin and her family collaborators and put them under house arrest. This government is eventually overthrown, and Dolphin and her family have a brief moment of happiness in a free Atlantis.

When Tempest channels the magic of all Atlantis' sorcerers to undo a spell that had turned Mera into an air-breather, he is noticed by the Spectre, who unleashes his full power on Atlantis. The resulting cataclysmic destruction obliterates Atlantis entirely. Tempest is missing and presumed dead, but Dolphin, sent away during Atlantis' destruction, may have survived, along with the young Cerdian.

One Year Later

Further evidence of her survival is given by the ghost of Vulko. Able to sense the passing of Atlanteans, he claimed never to have felt the passing of Garth, Dolphin, and Cerdian, so the three are possibly alive. However, despite having spent months researching his beloved ones,  Garth eventually reveals that he had found the bodies of his wife and son and reasons that Dolphin and Cerdian may have died during the evacuation of Atlantis, buried in the rubble while searching for shelter. Slizzath, his necromantic uncle, confirms this version, hinting a possible return of Dolphin as a Black Lantern

Blackest Night

In Blackest Night #2, Dolphin, Tula, and Aquaman are raised at Mercy Reef as Black Lanterns tasked with killing Tempest and Mera. Tula and Dolphin contend for Tempest's affection and mercilessly taunt him for being unable to save either of them. At the conclusion of the conflict, Tempest is killed and subsequently raised as a Black Lantern. Dolphin appears to battle the Titans. Her body is  destroyed by a burst of white light emanating from Dawn Granger.

Rebirth

Dolphin made her return when she joined Aquaman in defending seachanged Atlanteans from persecution and harassment in the Aquaman Rebirth series. She is currently on the run with Aquaman as they hide from the underwater authorities. In the new series, Dolphin is a mutation which is contemptibly referred to as a taintblood in the various tribes of Atlantis, having triggered it while facing segregation from the drift out of self-defense. She and a clutch of other 9th tride denizens were rescued by a ghost of the locale whom was none other than the believed to be deceased Arthur Curry.

Powers & abilities
Pre-Post Crisis Dolphin's anatomy had been tampered with by an unknown alien race at the biomolecular level, resulting in various oceanic-adapted capabilities, such as gills, webbed fingers and toes, shining white hair, superhuman physical conditioning, resilience to deep water pressures, and a slowed aging process. She is an adept yet untrained hand-to-hand combatant who was psychologically programmed with an aptitude for high-powered artillery. The biomolecular tampering and psychological programming resulted in Dolphin being strong, fast, and abled enough to match Mera in a straightforward fist fight while underwater. During the Blackest Night run, she'd been reanimated by the Black Lantern Ring, turning her into an all but unstoppable necrotized carcass with all the conventional powers of a Lantern Corpsmen coupled with vast self regenerative capabilities.

In the Rebirth run, Dolphin is a natural born Atlantean with paranatural alterations due to being born sea-changed, a magical mutation, which occurs in certain Atlanteans due to overexposure to the metaphysical energies that sustained them during Atlantis's fall, causing some water breathers to adopt more traits from fish and other marine biological lifeforms. Dolphin has all the typical Atlantean augmentations that come with surviving the crushing ocean depths. She possesses minor metamorphic abilities, such as the manifestation of light blue scales, webbed hands, and razor sharp nails, which can draw blood from other Atlanteans. Dolphin's biophysical deviance also enables her to generate natural light from her body, which is potent enough to induce seizures in individuals who look directly into her glare. She can focus her radiance to give it more concussive punch on top of increasing her physical melee. Dolphin can also use it to make air-drawings to articulate her thoughts and intentions.

Other versions
In the Elseworlds story JLA: The Nail, Dolphin makes an appearance in Professor Hamilton's Cadmus Labs.

In other media
Dolphin/Delphis appears in Young Justice: Outsiders episode "Quiet Conversations", voiced by Tiya Sircar. This version is an Indian teen kidnapped by Klarion. He activates her Meta-Gene as part of Project Rutabaga, but she is eventually saved by the Outsiders. She is later taken to Atlantis to live with Kaldur'ahm's parents as her powers leave her unable to survive outside of water. In the episode "Unknown Factors", Dolphin takes her name as she is watched by Kaldur'ahm and his partner Wynnde. In Young Justice: Phantoms, Dolphin takes the name of Delphis.

As of 2020, it has been reported that as pre-production for Aquaman and the Lost Kingdom is drawing toward a close, director James Wan is looking for another female lead to play Dolphin in Aquaman and the Lost Kingdom in order to diffuse tensions following the controversy between Johnny Depp and Amber Heard in the libel lawsuit between them with many of Depp's fans calling for Heard to be fired and replaced from Aquaman and the Lost Kingdom. In order to prevent a contract dispute but also often alienating fans of Depp or Heard, the addition of Dolphin as a new role for a new female lead is meant to "balance things out" by minimizing Heard's screentime. So far it has been reported that Jodie Comer from Killing Eve has met with DC for possibly taking on the lead female role of Dolphin in Aquaman and the Lost Kingdom. However, it has been reported that director Wan is looking for an Asian actress for the role with Warner Bros interested in casting a popular Asian actress for the role to keep Chinese and other Asian audiences engaged to repeat Aquaman's success in the market.

References

External links 

DC Comics Atlanteans
DC Comics female superheroes
DC Comics metahumans
DC Comics superheroes
DC Comics characters who are shapeshifters
DC Comics characters who can move at superhuman speeds
DC Comics characters with accelerated healing
DC Comics characters with superhuman strength
Fictional characters who can manipulate light
Fictional explorers
Fictional genetically engineered characters
Fictional mute characters
Comics characters introduced in 1968